Notocrater craticulatus is a southern, cold-water, deepwater species of limpet, a marine gastropod mollusc in the family Pseudococculinidae, one of the families of false limpets.

Distribution
This marine species is endemic to New Zealand.

References

 Powell A. W. B., William Collins Publishers Ltd, Auckland 1979 
 Marshall B.A. (1986 ["1985"]) Recent and Tertiary Cocculinidae and Pseudococculinidae (Mollusca: Gastropoda) from New Zealand and New South Wales. New Zealand Journal of Zoology 12: 505-546
 Maxwell, P.A. (2009). Cenozoic Mollusca. pp 232–254 in Gordon, D.P. (ed.) New Zealand inventory of biodiversity. Volume one. Kingdom Animalia: Radiata, Lophotrochozoa, Deuterostomia. Canterbury University Press, Christchurch.

Pseudococculinidae
Gastropods of New Zealand
Gastropods described in 1908